Marriage Story (Original Music from the Netflix film) is the score album to the 2019 film of the same name, directed by Noah Baumbach. The score is written and composed by Randy Newman, who previously worked with Baumbach on The Meyerowitz Stories (2017). Over 14 tracks were compiled into the album, which was recorded at the Newman Scoring Stage in 20th Century Fox Studios, with a 40-piece chamber orchestra, ranging from various instruments. Newman called the score as a "rush of cool water in a moviemaking era that rarely asks for things like lyricism, or instrumental solos".

The first track from the film "What I Love About Nicole" is the lead single from the album, released on November 1, 2019. Lakeshore Records marketed and released the soundtrack, digitally on November 15, and through CD on December 13. The score was positively received for Newman's composition, orchestration and diversity in the musical cues. For his score, Newman received nominations at various ceremonies including Academy Awards, Golden Globe and Satellite Awards, along with several other ceremonies hosted by critics' organisation.

Composition 
Randy Newman composed the film's score. While reading the script, Newman thought that he "sorted of the characters (Nicole and Charlie) as heroic in a way. And their love story — on one hand it’s very human, the experience of the movie sort of mirrors qualities of real life. But also saw it in the tradition of great film love stories too, or these stories of ‘love that can’t be’ for whatever reason, but still love that is worthy of celebration". The score started with the main themes of Charlie and Nicole, which was "an overture that introduces several thematic ideas for the characters".

Newman used a 40-piece chamber orchestra that featured a wide range of instruments, including, two flutes, two oboes, two clarinets, two bassoons, three horns, a trumpet, a trombone, two percussions, 12 violins, four violas, four cellos, a bass, and a harp. The score was recorded at the Newman Scoring Stage during mid-2019, and was inspired by his uncle Alfred Newman's works from the 1950s and 1960s, devoid of modern classification. The cues featured dialogues from the characters, Nicole and Charlie. While scoring, Newman said in his interview to Variety, stating "I don’t care so much if people don’t notice the score and it really works. This one works, and they’re noticing it. It’s all right with me if it just helps the picture like those ‘Toy Story’ pictures and the score is not mentioned. It’s not supposed to stick out. Yet in this one, I’m sticking out all over the place."

Critical reception 
James Southall of Movie Wave called it as a "beautiful, touching score for a film which frankly anybody who fancies a career as a film composer for something other than crash-bang movies would be very well advised to sit and study". Jonathan Broxton wrote "It’s rare in 2019 that a composer is asked to channel the spirit of New Wave-era Georges Delerue, and even rarer when a composer does it with this much taste and dexterity. The themes are lovely, the arrangements are sublime, and at just a touch under 30 minutes in length is a perfect accompaniment to a petit déjeuner of café au lait, pain au chocolat, and maybe a Gauloises or two." Rosie Pentreath of Classic FM wrote "The score features sparsely accompanied melodies with lyric tunes, passed between different instruments of the orchestra. The tunes are light and airy one minute, flecked with gloomy uncertainty the next – the perfect auditory metaphor for the trials of an unsuitable marriage, and uncertainty of going through divorce."

Aparna Narain of The Hindu wrote "The poignant soundtrack by Randy Newman (also nominated for a Golden Globe) proves to be the perfect accompaniment to the story". Terri White of Empire said "the lightly sombre notes of Randy Newman’s chamber orchestra score — beautifully and delicately sketches the tone of the entire film". Mark Kermode of The Guardian said "Randy Newman’s contrapuntally romantic score ensures that our heartstrings are pulled in several directions at once".

Track listing

Additional music 
The film featured singles from Tony K and Dua Lipa that are not included in the soundtrack. Adam Driver sings "Being Alive" from the musical Company written by Stephen Sondheim, in the film's conclusion, as Baumbach said "It’s good because it’s human. I wanted the song to have the same function songs do in musicals: the character arrives at another place by the end of the song. It’s story and character. This material offered many hidden and not so hidden genres in it." Also from Company, Scarlett Johansson,  Merritt Wever, and Julie Hagerty sing "You Can Drive a Person Crazy".

Release history

Awards and nominations

References 

2019 soundtrack albums
Film scores
Lakeshore Records soundtracks
Randy Newman soundtracks